Dear Jackie is a Canadian documentary film, directed by Henri Pardo and released in 2021. Conceived as a love letter to Jackie Robinson, the film explores the way the city of Montreal used its embrace of Robinson, when he played for the Montreal Royals in the 1940s, to construct a mythical image of itself as a post-racial city that had moved beyond anti-black racism, even while Black residents of the city's Little Burgundy neighbourhood were still suffering profound effects of racism in reality.

The film premiered at the 2021 Montreal International Documentary Festival, where Pardo won the Magnus Isacsson Award for socially conscious works by emerging Canadian filmmakers. It had a commercial release in June 2022.

References

External links

2021 films
2021 documentary films
Canadian documentary films
Documentary films about Black Canadians
English-language Canadian films
French-language Canadian films
Documentary films about Montreal
Cultural depictions of Jackie Robinson
Documentary films about racism in Canada
Canadian sports documentary films
2020s Canadian films